Aemilia ockendeni is a moth of the family Erebidae first described by Walter Rothschild in 1909. It is found in Peru and Bolivia.

References

External links

Moths described in 1909
Phaegopterina
Moths of South America